Julia Parnell (born 1979) is a New Zealand film and television producer and documentary director. For the last eleven years she has led the production company Notable Pictures. Her career started in 1999 and she has produced and directed hundreds of hours of documentary content including two feature films, thirty series, eleven one off docs and a documentary podcast.

Career
In 2010, Parnell won the Great Southern Television Woman to Watch Award.

Parnell left Butobase in early July 2010 to start her own production company, Notable Pictures.

Since the opening of Notable Pictures, Parnell has produced projects including two series of Bring Your Boots, OZ in collaboration with Māori Television's Glen Osborne, a documentary funded by Māori Television and New Zealand On Air about Henare O'Keefe, Māori social crusader and District Councilor for Hastings, New Zealand, Both Worlds, a New Zealand On Air-funded documentary series for broadcast on TV3. in which ten second generation New Zealanders share their experiences of either living a cultural clash or enjoying the best of both worlds, and a one-hour documentary on Māori restorative justice.

Parnell expanded into producing drama with two short films Hitch Hike and Friday Tigers, and a third film, Dive (2014, written and directed by Matthew J. Saville), all three funded by the New Zealand Film Commission.

Friday Tigers, written and directed by Aidee Walker, won the New Zealand International Film Festival's Best New Zealand Short Film for 2013.

Parnell produced and directed a documentary funded by Māori Television and New Zealand On Air, Rethinking Rehab, which aimed to provide an insight into the New Zealand Alcohol and Other Drug Treatment Court. She also worked on Loading Docs, a 2013 initiative in collaboration with the New Zealand Film Commission and NZ On Air. The project provides a launchpad for New Zealand documentary shorts, starting with ten three-minute films in 2014 based on the theme of home.

Filmography

References

2. Relocated Mountains. A New Wave, Documentary Magazine, 2007, p. 23,24.
3. Relocated Mountains. MTS Kurds doco to screen internationally, ONFILM production magazine, 2007, p. 9, 28

External links

Interview about Relocated Mountains documentary on Auckland radio station BFM

People from Auckland
Living people
New Zealand television producers
Women television producers
1979 births